Antonio Provana (1578–1640) was a Catholic prelate who served as Archbishop of Turin (1632–1640) and Archbishop of Durrës (1622–1632).

Biography
Antonio Provana was born in 1578 in Turin, Italy.
On 21 July 1622, he was appointed during the papacy of Pope Gregory XV as Archbishop of Durrës.
On 17 September 1623, he was consecrated bishop by Philibert François Milliet de Faverges, Archbishop of Turin, with Carlo Argentero, Bishop of Mondovi, serving as co-consecrator. 
On 19 January 1632, he was appointed during the papacy of Pope Urban VIII as Archbishop of Turin.
He served as Archbishop of Turin until his death on 25 July 1640.

Episcopal succession
While bishop, he was the principal consecrator of:
Benoît-Théophile de Chevron Villette, Archbishop of Tarentaise (1633);
Giusto Guérin, (Juste Guérin), Bishop of Geneva (1639);

and the principal co-consecrator of:

References

External links and additional sources
 (for Chronology of Bishops) 
 (for Chronology of Bishops) 
 (for Chronology of Bishops) 
 (for Chronology of Bishops) 

17th-century Italian Roman Catholic archbishops
Bishops appointed by Pope Gregory XV
Bishops appointed by Pope Urban VIII
1578 births
1640 deaths
17th-century Albanian Roman Catholic bishops